Rebecca Robinson may refer to:
 Rebecca Robinson (Neighbours), fictional character from the Australian soap opera Neighbours
 Rebecca Robinson (Miss Texas) (born 1984), American beauty pageant contestant
 Rebekah Robinson (born 1995), Jamaican netball player